The 2023 East Asia Super League will be the fourth overall and first regular season of the East Asia Super League, an international basketball club competition involving teams from domestic leagues in Japan, South Korea, Philippines and Taiwan, as well as a franchise team representing Greater China.

Originally set to be held from 12 October 2022 to February 2023 under a in home and away format and a Final Four knockout stage, the start of the EASL regular season was postponed to October 2023. 

The 2023 EASL Champions Week was organized in March as a pre-season tournament.

Team allocation
Four leagues are represented for the 2023 EASL. The champions and runners-up of the Japan B.League and the Korean Basketball League, as well as the champions of Taiwan's P. League+. Hong Kong based Bay Area Dragons, a franchise team, will also participate. The league considers the P. League+ champions and Dragons as the representatives of the "Greater China".

For the Philippines, the top two finishing teams of the 2022 PBA Philippine Cup qualified. Initially, the Philippine allocation was unclear since the Philippine Basketball Association holds multiple conferences or tournaments across a single season. Among the possibilities were drawing of lots among the top four PBA teams, forming a selection team or entering the national team.

Each team may have 12-men roster with two foreign players and an additional Asian player.

Qualified teams

Preparation

Original draw and format
The official draw for the 2022–23 EASL season was held on 28 June 2022 at the Shangri-La at the Fort, Manila in Taguig.

The teams were drawn in two groups. A coin flipping mechanic were used; each champion in each domestic league were made to choose a coin side. The winner of the coin flip were placed on Group A while the other placed in Group B. The identity of the Philippine representatives were yet to be determined at the time of the draw.

Each club was to play all the other clubs twice in home and away matches starting from 12 October 2022 to February 2023, with two EASL Group Stage games taking place every Wednesday night. The final four were to be play in a venue in Metro Manila in the Philippines in March 2023.

Postponement
A few weeks before the supposed opening day, the league announced the cancellation of the home and away season, instead pushing through with a "Champions Week" that was initially announced to be held in Manila in early 2023. The COVID-19 pandemic was blamed for the cancellation. Japan was later named the host country for this event.

Champions Week

In December, EASL announced that the Champions Week will be hosted by the qualifying Japanese teams, with the Utsunomiya Brex hosting the first six games, while the Ryukyu Golden Kings hosting the last six games at the Okinawa Arena. The Champions Week would be tagged as a "special tournament" which would proceed the start of the inaugural season proper.

Season
The 2023 East Asia Super League is set to begin around October 2023.

References

External links 
Official website

2022–23 in Asian basketball leagues